Justin Brown is an American politician who is a member of the Missouri Senate from the 16th district, serving since 2019. He is a member of the Republican party.

Education and career
Brown was born and raised in Phelps County, Missouri. Brown attended the University of Missouri-Rolla (now Missouri University of Science and Technology), where he graduated with a degree in history. After graduation, he worked in agricultural financing as a commercial loan officer. Brown now works as a farmer, raising corn and soybeans on more than 2,200 acres and maintaining a calf-cow operation. He is a member of the Missouri Cattleman's Association and has served on the boards of the Missouri Beef Council and the Phelps County Farm Bureau.

State Senate
2018

When his father, incumbent Dan W. Brown, was forced to leave office after being term-limited, Brown became a candidate for his seat in District 16. He ran against two candidates — Diane Franklin and Keith Frederick — in the Republican primary. Brown won with 40.1% of the vote. In the general election, he defeated Democrat Ryan Dillon to win by over 40%, or 24,285 votes.

Committee assignments
Agriculture, Food Production and Outdoor Resources
Appropriations
Government Reform
Transportation, Infrastructure, and Public Safety
Veterans Affairs and Mililtary Affairs (Vice-Chairman)
Transportation Oversight
Disaster Preparedness and Awareness

Election history

References

Living people
Republican Party Missouri state senators
21st-century American politicians
Missouri University of Science and Technology alumni
People from Phelps County, Missouri
Year of birth missing (living people)